Umberto Lenzi (August 6, 1931 – October 19, 2017) was an Italian film director whose filmography encompassed a ranges of genres across a prolific career. Born in Massa Marittima, Tuscany, Lenzi studied law before enrolling at the Centro Sperimentale di Cinematografia in Rome. As part of his studies, he wrote and directed the short film Ragazzi di Trastevere, based on  Pier Paolo Pasolini's novel Ragazzi di vita. During this time, he worked as a film critic for the Centro's journal Bianco e Nero, and was an avid follower of both European and American films, favouring the work of directors John Ford, Raoul Walsh, and Michael Curtiz. 

Lenzi's production career began as a location scout for the 1958 film Raw Wind in Eden; his directorial debut would come with 1961's pirate film Queen of the Seas. Lenzi worked across a broad variety of film genres, helming Spaghetti Westerns, gialli, spy films, war films, and poliziotteschi across his career. He was also an early figure in the cannibal boom as a result of his work on 1972's Man from the Deep River, along with later cannibal follow-ups Eaten Alive! (1980) and Cannibal Ferox (1981); these films would feature on the United Kingdom's "video nasties" list of banned releases. Although dismissive of his horror films and their cult following among fans, Lenzi believed that his work on genre films, and that of his peers in the Italian film industry, effectively bankrolled more artistic output from his compatriots.

Stylistically, Lenzi regularly made use of prominent close-up shots of his actors and employed zoom lens effects, but preferred to be seen primarily as a storyteller who was not heavy-handed with cinematic effects. Towards the end of his film career, Lenzi worked on foreign productions in the United States, including Welcome to Spring Break and Ghosthouse (both 1988), as well as directing a pair of television films for ReteItalia, La casa delle anime erranti and La casa dei sortilegi. He would continue to produce small-market films for a few years before retiring from film-making to become an author of detective fiction. Lenzi died at the age of 86, on October 19, 2017.

Filmography

Footnotes

General

References

 
 
 

 

Director filmographies
Italian filmographies